Anarsia pustulata is a moth of the family Gelechiidae. It was described by Anthonie Johannes Theodorus Janse in 1949. It is found in Namibia.

References

pustulata
Moths described in 1949
Moths of Africa